Mineo Kato (born 27 March 1934) is a Japanese former water polo player. He competed at the 1960 Summer Olympics and the 1964 Summer Olympics.

See also
 Japan men's Olympic water polo team records and statistics
 List of men's Olympic water polo tournament goalkeepers

References

External links
 

1934 births
Living people
Japanese male water polo players
Water polo goalkeepers
Olympic water polo players of Japan
Water polo players at the 1960 Summer Olympics
Water polo players at the 1964 Summer Olympics
Sportspeople from Tokyo
Asian Games medalists in water polo
Water polo players at the 1958 Asian Games
Water polo players at the 1962 Asian Games
Asian Games gold medalists for Japan
Medalists at the 1958 Asian Games
Medalists at the 1962 Asian Games
20th-century Japanese people
21st-century Japanese people